Santa Rita is a city in the state of Aragua, Venezuela. It is the shire town of the Francisco Linares Alcántara Municipality. It is part of the metropolitan area of Maracay.

Populated places in Aragua